Albu Ubeid (also: Albou Ubeid, Albou 'Ubeid, Albu 'Ubayd, Albu Obeid) is a village in Iraq, which is located in the Al Anbar Governorate north west of the city of Fallujah and east of Ramadi, on the river Euphrates. To the east lies Albu Bali, to the south Juwaybah. To the west lies Albu Aitha.

In 2016, during the Anbar offensive, there was intense fighting in the area between the Iraqi army and  ISIL militants. In August 2016, it was recaptured by Iraqi forces.

References 

Populated places in Al Anbar Governorate
Populated places on the Euphrates River